Rudolph Henderson Howat was Dean of Brechin from 1953 until 1957.

He was educated at St David's College, Lampeter and ordained in 1924. He was a Curate at All Saints, Wigan and then Precentor at St Mary's Cathedral, Edinburgh (Episcopal). After this he was Priest in charge of St Barnabas, Dennistoun then Rector of St John Girvan. From 1930 he was  Rector of  All Souls, Invergowrie.

Notes

Alumni of the University of Wales, Lampeter
Scottish Episcopalian clergy
Deans of Brechin
Year of birth missing
Year of death missing